{{Infobox rail service
| name =  Hapa–Shri Mata Vaishno Devi Katra Superfast Express
| image = 
| image_width = 
| caption = 
| type = Superfast
| locale = 
| first =| last =
| operator = Northern Railway zone
| ridership =
| start =  (HAPA)
| stops = 29
| end =  (SDVK)
| distance = 
| journeytime =  32 hrs 45 mins
| frequency = Weekly
| class = AC 2 tier, AC 3 tier, Sleeper class, General Unreserved
| seating = No
| sleeping = Yes
| autorack =
| catering = No
| observation = 
| entertainment = No
| baggage = Below the seats
| otherfacilities=
| stock = 2
| gauge = 
| el =
| trainnumber = 12475/12476
| speed = 
| map =
| map_state =
}}

It is currently being operated with 12475/12476 train numbers on a weekly basis.

Coach composition 

This train now has new modern LHB rakes replaced by outdated ICF rakes. The train consists of 22 coaches:

 2 AC II Tier
 5 AC III Tier
 10 Sleeper Coaches
 1 Pantry Car
 2 General
 2 End On Generation

Service 

The 12475/Hapa–Shri Mata Vaishno Devi Katra Superfast Express has an average speed of 62 km/hr and covers 2059 km in 33 hrs 10 mins.

The 12476/Shri Mata Vaishno Devi Katra–Hapa Superfast Express has an average speed of 63 km/hr and covers 2059 km in 32 hrs 35 mins.

Route and halts 

The important halts of the train are:

Schedule

Traction 

Rake sharing 

This train shares its rake with

 12471/12472 Swaraj Express
 12473/12474 Gandhidham–Shri Mata Vaishno Devi Katra Sarvodaya Express
 12477/12478 Jamnagar–Shri Mata Vaishno Devi Katra Superfast Express

See also 

 Ahmedabad Junction railway station
 Shri Mata Vaishno Devi Katra railway station

Notes

References

External links 

 12475/Hapa–Shri Mata Vaishno Devi Katra Superfast Express
 12476/Shri Mata Vaishno Devi Katra–Hapa Superfast Express

Transport in Jamnagar
Transport in Katra, Jammu and Kashmir
Express trains in India
Rail transport in Madhya Pradesh
Rail transport in Gujarat
Rail transport in Rajasthan
Rail transport in Delhi
Rail transport in Haryana
Rail transport in Punjab, India
Rail transport in Jammu and Kashmir
Railway services introduced in 1990